Bely Rast High Voltage Research Station is a facility for the development of high voltage equipment in Russia, situated at Bely Rast, Moscow Oblast near the eponymous station of the Greater Ring of the Moscow Railway.  Built in 1966, the equipment of the 750 kV- and 1150 kV-lines in Russia and other parts of the former Soviet Union were first developed and tested at this facility, as well as the equipment for the never completed HVDC Ekibastuz–Centre. The facility also has an unused 1150 kV AC and a 1500 kV DC line. The DC line was the prototype of the never finished HVDC Ekibastuz–Centre.

References

External links 

 Wikimap of Bely Rast Research Station

Research stations
Energy research institutes
Research institutes in Russia
Research institutes in the Soviet Union
1966 establishments in the Soviet Union
Energy in the Soviet Union
Research institutes established in 1966